The Equipment Development Department of the Central Military Commission  is the chief organ under the Central Military Commission of the People's Republic of China. It was founded on January 11, 2016, under Xi Jinping's military reforms. 
The department continues to oversee and improve military technology. Gen. Zhang Youxia served as the first director. The current director is Li Shangfu.

In September 2018, following a purchase of aircraft and missile equipment from Russian arms exporter Rosoboronexport, both the EDD and Li were sanctioned by the United States State Department per the Countering America's Adversaries Through Sanctions Act.

References

See also 

 Central Military Commission (China)
 People's Liberation Army General Armaments Department (abolished)

Central Military Commission (China)
2016 establishments in China
Defence agencies of China
Government agencies established in 2016